The Sun Odyssey 32i is a French sailboat that was designed by Philippe Briand as a cruiser-racer and first built in 2005.

The "i" in the designation indicates that the deck is injection-molded.

The Sun Odyssey 32i is part of the Sun Odyssey sailboat range and was developed into the Sun Fast 32i.

Production
The design was built by Jeanneau in France, from 2005 until 2008, but it is now out of production.

Design
The Sun Odyssey 32i is a recreational keelboat, built predominantly of fiberglass. The hull kis made from single skin fiberglass polyester, while the deck is a fiberglass polyester sandwich. The boat has a fractional sloop rig, with a deck-stepped mast, one set of swept spreaders and aluminum spars with 1x19 strand stainless steel wire standing rigging. The hull has a nearly-plumb stem, a walk-through reverse transom, an internally mounted spade-type rudder controlled by a wheel  and a fixed fin keel, shoal dfraft keel or keel and centerboard combination.

The design has sleeping accommodation for six people, with a double "V"-berth in the bow cabin, an "L"-shaped settee and a straight settee in the main cabin and an aft cabin with a double berth on the port side. The galley is located on the starboard side at the companionway ladder. The galley is "U"-shaped and is equipped with a two-burner stove, ice box and a sink. A navigation station is opposite the galley, on the port side. The head is located amidships on the port side.

Variants
Sun Odyssey 32i Deep Draft
This model features a deep draft, L-shaped keel. It displaces  and carries  of cast iron ballast.
Sun Odyssey 32i Performance
It displaces  and carries  of cast iron ballast.
Sun Odyssey 32i Shoal Draft
This model has a shoal draft keel for operation in areas with shallower water. It displaces  and carries  of cast iron ballast.
Sun Odyssey 32i Keel and Centerboard
This model has a keel and retractable centerboard. It displaces  and carries  of ballast, made up of a cast iron exterior ballast weight and a steel centerboard.

See also
List of sailing boat types

Related development
Sun Fast 32i

References

External links

Keelboats
2000s sailboat type designs
Sailing yachts
Sailboat type designs by Philippe Briand
Sailboat types built by Jeanneau